Kas Futialo, known by the stage name Tha Feelstyle, is a New Zealand hip hop artist of Samoan descent. His first album was Break It To Pieces in 2004. Tha Feelstyle was born in Samoa and moved to New Zealand in the 1980s. He raps in English as well as the Samoan language.

History
Tha Feelstyle entered his first rap competition in 1987 and under the name of RIQ was part of the Wellington hip hop duo Rough Opinion with Samoan rapper K.O.S. In the 1990s, he was a member of The Overstayers which included King Kapisi and DJ Raw (aka Ian Seumanu). He has also worked with Andy Morton (aka The Submariner) an experienced producer in Auckland who has worked with various New Zealand artists including King Kapisi and Che Fu. The music video for Tha Feelystyle's award-winning single Suamalie/Ain't Mad at You was filmed in Samoa and directed by New Zealand filmmaker Chris Graham, the director of feature film Sione's Wedding. The track also featured in the movie. In 2009, Tha Feelstyle toured New Zealand with King Kapisi. In 2008, Tha Feelstyle released the Samoan-language album Lokokasi. In March 2011, he released his third album Good Morning Samoa, at the Pasifika Festival. Good Morning Samoa was nominated for three awards at the 2012 Pacific Music Awards - for Best Pacific Male Artist, Best Pacific Language album, and Best Pacific Music Album.

Awards

|-
| 2005
| Tha Feelstyle - Break It To Pieces
| Pacific Music Awards - Best Pacific Male Artist
| 
|-
| 2005
| Tha Feelstyle - Break It To Pieces
| Pacific Music Awards - Best Pacific Urban Artist
| 
|-
| 2005
| Kas Futialo and Ian Seumanu - "Su'amalie"
| Pacific Music Awards - APRA Best Pacific Song
| 
|-
| 2005
| Kas Futialo, Andy Morton, Grant Osborne & Andrew B. White - Break It To Pieces (Tha Feelstyle)
| New Zealand Music Awards - Best Album Cover
| 
|-
| 2005
| Tha Feelstyle – Break It To Pieces
| New Zealand Music Awards - Breakthrough Artist of the Year
| 
|-
| 2005
| Tha Feelstyle – Break It To Pieces
| New Zealand Music Awards - Best Urban/Hip Hop Album
| 
|-
| 2012
| Kas Futialo (aka Tha Feelstyle), Good Morning Samoa
| New Zealand Music Awards - Best Pacific Music Album
| 
|-
|}

References

External links
Watch Suamalie music video NZ On Screen website
NZ Herald article
NZ Musician Magazine interview, 2004
One Samoana Notebook interview, 2011
Tha Feelstyle's music on Amplifier.co.nz

Samoan artists
New Zealand people of Samoan descent
New Zealand rappers
Living people
Pacific Music Award-winning artists
Year of birth missing (living people)